Lasiopetalum oppositifolium is a species of flowering plant in the family Malvaceae and is endemic to the south-west of Western Australia. It is an open, erect shrub with rusty-hairy young stems, linear, narrowly elliptic or narrowly egg-shaped leaves and white, pink and dark red flowers.

Description
The lower surface of the leaves is densely covered with white and rust-coloured, star-shaped hairs, the upper surface only hairy when very young. Flowering occurs from July to September.

Taxonomy
Lasiopetalum oppositifolium was first formally described in 1860 by Ferdinand von Mueller in Fragmenta Phytographiae Australiae from specimens collected near the Murchison River by Augustus Oldfield. The specific epithet (oppositifolium) means "opposite-leaved".

Distribution and habitat
This lasiopetalum grows on cliffs, gorge slopes and breakaways in shrubland or scrub in a few places near Kalbarri in the Geraldton Sandplains biogeographic region of south-western Western Australia.

Conservation status
Lasiopetalum oppositifolium is listed as "Priority Three" by the Government of Western Australia Department of Biodiversity, Conservation and Attractions, meaning that it is poorly known and known from only a few locations but is not under imminent threat.

References

oppositifolium
Malvales of Australia
Rosids of Western Australia
Plants described in 1860
Taxa named by Ferdinand von Mueller